Pro Evolution Soccer 2015 (abbreviated as PES 2015 and known as World Soccer: Winning Eleven 2015 in Japan) is a football simulation game developed by PES Productions and published by Konami for Microsoft Windows, PlayStation 3, PlayStation 4, Xbox 360, and Xbox One. It is the fourteenth edition of the Pro Evolution Soccer series. The cover of the game features Mario Götze of Bayern Munich (except for the Japanese version, whose cover art features Keisuke Honda of A.C. Milan). In this game, the slogan used was The Pitch is Ours for the first time. PES 2015 was followed by Pro Evolution Soccer 2016.

Downloadable content
The game's first downloadable content pack was released on 9 November 2014, ahead of the official launch of PES 2015 on 13 November. The pack adds an extra eight European teams (Slovan Bratislava, FK Partizan, Maccabi Tel Aviv, Ludogorets Razgrad, HJK Helsinki, Qarabağ, Legia Warsaw, Sparta Prague), the Copa Sudamericana 2014 tournament, summer transfers, new player faces, latest squad lineups, and a series of latest boots from Adidas, Nike and Puma.

A second downloadable content pack was released on 15 December, adding four new teams and stadia, among other updates.

Demo
The PES 2015 demo became available on 1 September 2014. The playable teams are Bayern Munich, Barcelona, Real Madrid, Atlético Madrid, Juventus, & Napoli.

Reception

The game sold 1.72million units worldwide.

Pro Evolution Soccer 2015 received generally positive reviews from critics. IGN scored it a 9 out of 10, stating "PES 2015 embraces its PS2-era roots while offering almost everything you could want from a modern football simulation." However, they criticized the presentation, saying that it still needs some work. Hardcore Gamer gave the game a 4 out of 5, saying, "After a few submissive years, Konami has put forth a game that caters to soccer fans with superb flexibility for creative expression, fluid gameplay and astoundingly intelligent AI."

References

External links
 Official website

2014 video games
Association football video games
J.League licensed video games
Konami games
Multiplayer and single-player video games
Video games with AI-versus-AI modes
PlayStation 3 games
PlayStation 4 games
2015
Sports video games set in France
Sports video games set in Germany
Sports video games set in Italy
Video games set in 2014
Video games set in 2015
Video games set in Argentina
Video games set in Asia
Video games set in Brazil
Video games set in Chile
Video games set in England
Video games set in Europe
Video games set in France
Video games set in Germany
Video games set in Italy
Video games set in Japan
Video games set in Monaco
Video games set in Poland
Video games set in Portugal
Video games set in South America
Video games set in South Korea
Video games set in Spain
Video games set in the Netherlands
Video games set in the United Kingdom
Windows games
Xbox 360 games
Xbox One games
La Liga licensed video games
Sports video games with career mode
Video games developed in Japan